Caccini is the name of several composers and artists from Florence:

 Giulio Caccini (1551–1618), Florentine composer, significant innovator of the early Baroque era
 Francesca Caccini (1587–1641?), Giulio's daughter, and a well-known opera composer in the early 17th century
 Settimia Caccini (1591–1638?) Giulio's daughter, a singer and occasional composer
 Giovanni Battista Caccini (1556 – c.1612/14), Florentine Mannerist sculptor
 Tommaso Caccini (1574–1648), Dominican friar who denounced Galileo from the pulpit

Italian-language surnames